Mikel Losada García (born December 28, 1978, Ermua, Spain) is a Spanish film, theater and television actor.

He has worked on more than one hundred audiovisual productions, including Ane Is Missing or Intimacy (Netflix). He also in more than a hundred theater productions throughout Spain.

He has been nominated up to three times for the Best Basque Actor Award at the Union of Basque Actors and Actresses Awards (Besarkada Awards), the last time in 2022 for the film Ane Is Missing. In 2001 he won the Award for Best Television Actor at the Union of Basque Actors and Actresses Awards (Besarkada Awards) and was nominated in the same category in 2022 for the Netflix series Intimacy.

Life and career 

He was born in Ermua in 1978. At sixteen he got his first roles in theatrical and audiovisual projects. At eighteen he joined Ramón Barea's theater company. Since then he has worked in more than one hundred audiovisual productions and also in more than one hundred theater productions.

He has been nominated up to three times for the Best Basque Actor Award at the Union of Basque Actors and Actresses Awards (Besarkada Awards), the last time in 2022 for the film Ane Is Missing. In 2001 he won the Award for Best Television Actor at the Union of Basque Actors and Actresses Awards (Besarkada Awards) and was nominated in the same category in 2022 for the Netflix series Intimacy.

In 2015, he was part of the cast in the theater production The Seagull, an original production of the Arriaga Theater, directed by the Argentinean Gustavo Tambascio, together with Gurutze Beitia, Lander Otaola and Ylenia Baglietto. Also in that year he co-starred in the film Txarriboda.

In 2016, he participated in the film The Invisible Guardian (based on the novel by Dolores Redondo), together with Marta Etura. A year later, in 2017, he co-starred in the film La Higuera de los Bastardos, directed by Ana Murugarren.

In 2020, he co-starred in the film Ane Is Missing along with Patricia López Arnaiz. The film received five nominations at the Goya Awards, including the Best Film Award, and won three Goyas.

In 2021 he was part of the theatrical production of the Arriaga Theater El viaje a ninguna parte, directed by Ramón Barea.​ Due to his performance in that theatrical production, Losada received the Urregin Award in the category of Best Actor.

In 2021, he co-starred in the film García y García, directed by Ana Murugarren, along with José Mota, Pepe Viyuela and Jordi Sánchez. In 2023 he participated in its sequel García y García 2, also directed by Ana Murugarren.

He is one of the founding partners of the Pabellón Nº 6 project.

Private life 
He currently lives in Bilbao. He is in a relationship with actress Olatz Ganboa. In 2016 she and Losada represented Los amantes del Casco Viejo, a theatre production of the Arriaga Theatre. They also recorded the series Etxekoak together, on ETB 1, in full confinement due to the COVID pandemic in 2020. He has a border collie named Kea.

She has a great friendship with the filmmaker Ana Murugarren and, as she herself has explained, Losada appears in all her films. She also has a very close friendship with the actor Ramón Barea, whom Losada considers his friend and mentor.

Filmography

Television 

 2022, El silencio, Netflix
 2022, Intimacy, Netflix
 2022, Tupper Club (invited by Ana Murugarren)
 2020, Etxekoak
 2014, No es País para Sosos (special guest)
 2011, El precio de la libertad
 2010, Ciudad K
 2008, Go!azen
 2001, Cuéntame
 2001, Goenkale

Film 

 2023 García y García 2, dir. Ana Murugarren
 2021 García y García
 2020 Ane Is Missing
 2019 La pequeña Suiza 
 2017 La higuera de los bastardos
 2016 Igelak
 2016 The Invisible Guardian
 2015 Txarriboda
 2013 Tres mentiras
 2013 Alaba zintzoa
 2012 Bypass 
 2012 El extraño anfitrión (TV)
 2012 TESLA. VERSIÓN 04
 2011 El precio de la libertad
 2010 Dragoi ehiztaria 
 2009 Sukalde kontuak
 2008 Go!azen
 2007 Casual Day
 2006 Kutsidazu bidea, Ixabel
 2005 Corrientes circulares
 2005 Hoja de ruta 
 2004 El coche de pedales
 2001 Lázaro 
 2000 Los amigos
 1999 Pecados provinciales
 1994 La voz de su amo

Stage 

 2022, Bake Lehorra / La Paz Estéril
 2022, La cazadora de mitos
 2021, El viaje a ninguna parte
 2019, Macbeth
 2016, Los amantes del casco viejo. Dir. Patxo Tellería
 2016, Historia casi de mi vida. Dir. Ramón Barea
 2016, A Midsummer Night's Dream. Dir. Pablo Viar
 2015, The Seagull. dir. Gustavo Tambascio
 2014, Fausto Ciudadano Ejemplar, Dir. Galder Pérez y Mikel Losada
 2013, Los enamorados, de Carlo Goldoni, Dir. Marco Carniti
 2013, Terapias, Dir. Rafael Calatayud
 2012, El hijo del acordeonista, Dir. Fernando Bernues
 2012, Esencia patria, Dir. Ramón Barea
 2011, Sekula Bai, Dir. Lander Otaola. Galder Pérez y Mikel Losada
 2008, Comida para peces, Dir. Fernando Bernues
 2005, El hombre de los dados, Ramón Barea
 2004, The Tempest, Ur Teatro. Dir. Helena Pimenta
 2003, Deseo, Markeliñe.
 2002, Chincha Rapiña, Txamuskina Teatro. Dir. Eguski Zubia
 2001, Notas de cocina, Dir. Felipe Loza
 2000,' Kaioa Eta Katua, Txamuskina Teatro
 2000, Txamuskina, Teatro Mohicano. Dir: Ramón Barea
 1999, Alias, Molière, Dir. Ramón Barea
 1999, Todo Lorca, Cinema Ermua. Dir. Juan Carlos Colina
 1999, Crímenes ejemplares, de Max Aub. Dir: Itziar Lazkano
 1999, Solos esta noche, de Paloma Pedrero. Dir: Felipe Loza

Awards

Max Awards

Union of Basque Actors and Actresses Awards

Urregin Award

See also 

 Ramón Barea

References

External links 

 

1978 births
Living people
People from Bilbao
20th-century Spanish actors
21st-century Spanish actors
Spanish stage actors
Spanish film actors
Spanish television actors